Bicyclo[2.2.1]heptane-2-carbonitrile is a chemical which is classified as an extremely hazardous substance in the United States as defined in Section 302 of the U.S. Emergency Planning and Community Right-to-Know Act (42 U.S.C. 11002), and is subject to strict reporting requirements by facilities which produce, store, or use it in significant quantities.

See also
BIDN
Cloflubicyne

References

Nitriles
Pesticides
Norbornanes